The Seattle Mariners  season was their tenth since the franchise creation.

At Boston's Fenway Park on Tuesday, April 29, twenty Mariners were struck out by 23-year-old Roger Clemens to set a new major league record. The game was scoreless through six innings, and the Red Sox won 3–1.

Offseason
 November 1, 1985: Bob Long was released by the Mariners.
 December 12, 1985: Darnell Coles was traded by the Mariners to the Detroit Tigers for Rich Monteleone.
January 18, 1986: Jerry Dybzinski was signed as a free agent with the Mariners.
 January 18, 1986: Steve Fireovid was signed as a free agent by the Mariners.
 January 18, 1986: Pete Ladd was signed as a free agent by the Mariners.
 March 31, 1986: Jerry Dybzinski was released by the Mariners.

Regular season

Season standings

Record vs. opponents

Notable transactions
 May 21, 1986: Terry Bell was traded to the Kansas City Royals for Mark Huismann.
 August 19, 1986: Spike Owen and Dave Henderson were traded to the Boston Red Sox for Rey Quiñones, Mike Brown, Mike Trujillo, and a player to be named later.

Roster

Player stats

Batting

Starters by position
Note: Pos = Position; G = Games played; AB = At bats; H = Hits; Avg. = Batting average; HR = Home runs; RBI = Runs batted in

Other batters
Note: G = Games played; AB = At bats; H = Hits; Avg. = Batting average; RBI = Runs batted in

Pitching

Starting pitchers 
Note: G = Games pitched; IP = Innings pitched; W = Wins; L = Losses; ERA = Earned run average; SO = Strikeouts

Other pitchers 
Note: G = Games pitched; IP = Innings pitched; W = Wins; L = Losses; ERA = Earned run average; SO = Strikeouts

Relief pitchers 
Note: G = Games pitched; W = Wins; L = Losses; SV = Saves; ERA = Earned run average; SO = Strikeouts

Farm system

LEAGUE CHAMPIONS: Bellingham

References

External links
1986 Seattle Mariners at Baseball Reference
1986 Seattle Mariners team page at www.baseball-almanac.com

Seattle Mariners seasons
Seattle Mariners season
Seattle Mariners